Portofino transmitter is a facility for FM-/AM-/TV-broadcasting near Portofino in Italy.
Portofino transmitter uses for the mediumwave transmitter, which works on 1575 kHz with 50 kW
a very unusual antenna, which consists of a wire which is fixed on a rope that is spun over a distance of 590 metres between a rock anchor and a 130 metres tall lattice tower, which carries the FM-/TV-broadcasting antennas.
This may be the only broadcasting transmitter in Europe, which uses a wire span over a valley as part of the antenna system.
Close to the main tower, there is a second lattice tower with triangular cross section.

See also 
 List of towers
 List of spans

External links 
 http://mediasuk.org/archive/portofino.html

Towers in Italy
Buildings and structures in Liguria
Broadcast transmitters